Amanda Jane Levete CBE, RA (17 November 1955) explores the transformation of space through her numerous buildings and furniture pieces. Levete enjoys creating the unexpected, and exploring the utilization of opposition. Levete is known for the utilization of organic and man-made products in the same space. Levete is known for making clients visions a reality, because of her talents Levete is a Stirling Prize-winning British architect, and principal of AL_A.

Training
Originally from Bridgend, south Wales, Levete was a student at St Paul's Girls' School, London and the Hammersmith School of Art, enrolled at the Architectural Association. After finishing school she became a trainee at Alsop & Lyall and an architect at the Richard Rogers Partnership. As co-founder of the firm Powis & Levete, she was nominated for the RIBA's '40 under 40' exhibition in 1985. Levete joined Jan Kaplický at Future Systems as a partner in 1989, served as a trustee of the arts organisation Artangel from 2000 to 2013, and is a trustee of the Young Foundation.

Career
Levete formed AL A (formerly known as Amanda Levete Architecture) in 2009, and in 2011 the practice won the international competition to design a new main entrance on Exhibition Road. Levete also designed the courtyard and gallery for London's Victoria and Albert Museum, which features a porcelain courtyard (paved with 11,000 handmade ceramic tiles). This commission, is the museum's largest project in over 100 years. AL_A's projects include the MAAT (Museum of Art, Architecture and Technology) project in Lisbon for the EDP Foundation, the Central Embassy project in Bangkok, 10 Hill's Place in London and the pop-up restaurant Tincan.

In 2018 Levete was among 4 ,out of 42 teams, that were shortlisted to redesign the visitor experience for the Eiffel Tower in Paris. Levete and the three other teams will work to redesign how people interact with the tower. This project is in collaboration with the City of Paris government in preparation for the 2024 Summer Olympics.

Amanda Levete also enjoys pushing materials and designs to their limit in her furniture pieces.  She has produced pieces for Established and Sons. Some of her most acclaimed, furniture pieces are the Drift bench and Around the Corner pieces. In these pieces Levete utilized the simotanious use of advanced software and hand working.

Levete and her firm have also been awarded some smaller scale projects like, the design of Wadham College at the University of Oxford. Their design of the Dr. Lee Shau Kee Building and William Doo Undergraduate Centre will provide spaces for the student body to gather, as well as support the universities access programs.

After Levete's work on the Victoria and Albert Museum, Levete and her firm released their proposal to revamp the Paisley Museum in Scotland. Their proposal would, allow an accomidation of visitors from Scotland, the UK and aborad. Their mission was to showcase the Scottish town that has influcned the world. They plan on doing this through restoring and reinvigorating the current museum.

Similarly Levete has worked on designing a building for Maggie's cancer care charity in Southampton.  Her additional projects around the world include, three hospital buildings in Cyprus, the reimagine of the D’Ieteren Headquarters in Brussels; and the design of a prototype fusion plant for clean energy firm General Fusion at Culham.

Awards
In the 2017 Queen's Birthday Honours Amanda Levete was appointed Commander of the Order of the British Empire (CBE), for services to architecture.

In 2018, Levete was awarded the Jane Drew Prize by the Architects' Journal and Architectural Review. The Jane Drew Prize recognizes those elevate the profile of women in architecture through their commitment to design excellence.

In 2019 she was elected an Honorary Fellow of the American Institute of Architects.

In 2021 she was elected to be a Royal Academician.

Levete has been awarded prestigious commissions such as hotel and mall development and Bangkok  under the Central Retail Corporation as well Levete has designed the media campus for News Corporation in East London

Personal life
Levete met the Czech architect Jan Kaplický in the 1980s. They married in 1991, had a son, Josef, in 1995 and divorced in 2006. Levete and Kaplický worked professionally together from 1989 to 2009. Since 2007 Levete has been married to Ben Evans, director of the London Design Festival.

On 19 March 2017, Amanda Levete appeared as a castaway on the Radio 4 programme Desert Island Discs.

References

External links
AL_A
Future Systems
AL_A- Amanda Levete at ALA
Amanda Levete – Designer Profile at Stylepark
Amanda Levete - Artist at Royal Academy
Amanda Levete - Tag at ArchDaily
London Museums Exhibitions- at in exhibit

1955 births
Living people
People educated at St Paul's Girls' School
Alumni of the Architectural Association School of Architecture
British women architects
Welsh architects
People from Bridgend
Commanders of the Order of the British Empire
Royal Academicians